The Psychodinae are the nominate subfamily of moth flies (Psychodidae), also known as drain flies. Like most of their relatives, they are usually found in damp habitats; some occur in caves. The small larvae are aquatic or semi-terrestrial; the adults are winged and capable of flight. Psychodinae are found worldwide, including some subantarctic islands.

Description 
Adult Psychodinae are small flies that do not exceed 5-6 mm in length. Their body, legs and wings are covered in many setae which (in males) are often pigmented, resulting in colour patterns. Their eyes are usually reniform and connected dorsomedially by an eye-bridge. The antennae each consist of a scape, pedicel and 12-14 flagellomeres, and each flagellomere has one or more ascoids of variable shape. The wings are ovate in shape with 9-10 longitudinal veins and almost no crossveins. Species of Psychodinae often look similar, only being distinguishable by the shape of the male genitalia.

Larval Psychodinae are segmented with each segment subdivided and each subdivision dorsally sclerotised. The tergal sclerites have true and accessorial setae which are useful for determining species. Unlike in other subfamilies of Psychodidae, the abdomen ends in a tubular siphon tipped with spiracles.

Habitat and diet 
The larval biology of Psychodinae has mainly been studied for Palearctic and Nearctic taxa, with less known about Afrotropical taxa. Most are detritivores in marginal freshwater habitats such as the edges of springs and streams, waterlogged soils and phytotelmata. They also occur in leaf litter, compost, decaying wood, fungal fruiting bodies, dung, carrion, caves, drains and sewage pipes. A few species may cause myiasis.

Pupation occurs on the surface of the organic film inhabited by larvae.

Humans may encounter adult Psychodinae in bathrooms and sewage installations. Adults are drawn to artificial light. They feed on polluted water and the nectar of flowers.

Reproduction 
Males locate females using species-specific pheromones, and also produce pheromones themselves for courtship. Psychodid antennae have sensilla that may be used for detecting these pheromones. Many Psychodinae also have specialised secondary sexual characteristics for release and detection of chemical cues. They also use visual and tactile displays.

Tribes and genera

Maruinini Enderlein, 1937
Alloeodidicrum Duckhouse, 1990
Didicrum Enderlein, 1937
Eremolobulosa Duckhouse, 1990
Maruina Müller, 1895
Paratelmatoscopus Satchell, 1953
Rotundopteryx Duckhouse, 1990
Setomimini Vaillant, 1982
Arisemus Satchell, 1955
Australopericoma Vaillant, 1975
Balbagathis Quate, 1996
Lobulosa Szabo, 1960
Neoarisemus Botosaneanu & Vaillant, 1970
Parasetomima Duckhouse, 1968 
Platyplastinx Enderlein, 1937
Setomima Enderlein, 1937
Tonnoiriella Vaillant, 1982
Mormiini Enderlein, 1937
Atrichobrunettia Satchell, 1953
Brunettia Annandale, 1910
Gerobrunettia Quate & Quate, 1967
Mormia Enderlein, 1935
Paramormiini Enderlein, 1937
Clogmia Enderlein, 1937
Eurygarka Quate, 1959
Feuerborniella Vaillant, 1971
Panimerus Eaton, 1913
Paramormia Enderlein, 1935
Peripsychoda Enderlein, 1935
Philosepedon Eaton, 1904
Telmatoscopus Eaton, 1904
Threticus Eaton, 1904
Trichopsychoda Tonnoir, 1922
Vaillantodes Wagner, 2002
Pericomaini Enderlein, 1935
Bazarella Vaillant, 1961
Berdeniella Vaillant, 1971
Breviscapus Quate, 1955
Clytocerus Eaton, 1904
Lepidiella Enderlein, 1937
Notiocharis Eaton, 1913
Pericoma Haliday, in Walker, 1856
Pneumia Enderlein, 1935
Saraiella Vaillant, 1981
Stupkaiella Vaillant, 1973
Szaboiella Vaillant, 1979
Thornburghiella Vaillant, 1982
Ulomyia Haliday, in Walker, 1856 (= Saccopterix Haliday, in Curtis, 1839, preoccupied)
Psychodini Quate, 1959
Epacretron Quate, 1965
Psychoda Latreille, 1796

References

External links
 
 

Psychodidae
Nematocera subfamilies
Articles containing video clips
Taxa named by Edward Newman